Abir El Saghir is Lebanese chef and influencer from West Bekaa, Lebanon and a self-taught chef. 

She is TikTok content creator with more than 17 million followers. Her videos shows cooking from around the world.

She won Joy Awards as Favorite Female Influencer of the year 2023

References 

Living people
Lebanese chefs
TikTokers
People from Western Beqaa District